The men's giant slalom competition of the 2015 Winter Universiade was held at Universiade slope, Sierra Nevada, Spain on February 12, 2015.

Results

Men's giant slalom